Jorma Olavi "Jope" Ruonansuu (15 April 1964 – 18 July 2020) was a Finnish actor, impressionist, musician and comedian. He was born in Kemi. He won the Best performer Venla award in 2010.

Ruonansuu was diagnosed with esophageal cancer in 2018. He died from the disease on 18 July 2020, aged 56.

Filmography

Films 
 Ruuvit löysällä (1989) – singer
 Pekko aikamiespojan poikamiesaika (1993) – Heka Haimakainen
 Pekko ja poika (1994) – Heka Haimakainen
 Pekko ja muukalainen (1996) – Heka Haimakainen
 Pekko ja unissakävelijä (1997) – Heka Haimakainen
 Johtaja Uuno Turhapuro – pisnismies (1998) – President Ahtisaari
 Uuno Turhapuro – This Is My Life (2004) – President Ahtisaari
 Matti (2006) – Oksanen
 V2: Dead Angel (V2 – jäätynyt enkeli, 2007) – Police Lieutenant Hautavainio
 Ganes (2007) – Remu's boss
 The Storage (2011)

Television programs 
 Klaustrofobia (1982)
 Vesku Show (1988)
 Viemäri-TV (1989)
 Neurovisio (1992)
 Jopen videokoulu (1993)
 Herra 47 (1994)
 Hömppäveikot (1996)
 Ruonansuu & Petelius Co. (1997)
 Team Ahma (1998–1999)
 Ö-studio (1998–1999)
 Koivula ja tähdet (2000)
 Jurismia! (2001)
 Jopet Show (2005–2011)
 6pack (2008)
 Hymy Pyllyyn (2008–2009)

Discography

Albums 
 Matkiva kulkuri (1988)
 Elvis-osasto (1992)
 Täällä Washington (1992)
 Politiikkaa ja erotiikkaa (1993)
 Jope Ruonansuu presidentiksi (1993)
 Kiikun kaakun (1994)
 Washington Bar (1995)
 Piinapenkki (1996)
 Vara Mara (1997)
 Neuroopan omistajat (1999)
 Hauskaa joulua t: Jope (2000)
 Lomakiertue (2001)
 Työnnä kännykkä hanuriin (2002)
 Finnshits (2003)
 Tosi-CD (2004)
 Me hirviöt (2006)
 Tanssii läskien kanssa (2007)
 Enkeleitä toisillemme – Herkimmät laulut (2008)
 Kunnioittaen – Yhden miehen tribuutti (2009)
 Naamakirja (2010)
 Veljekset Kuin Kyljykset (2012)
 Jope Ruonansuu ja Porsaanperän pikkujoulut (2013)
 Biisinmurtajat (2016)

Singles 
 Nyt lähtee läskit / Rantamiehen balladi (1991)
 Hyppää pois / Ilman jarruja helvettiin (1991)
 Pappi vaan joi (1995)
 Kaikki menee kun sovittelee / Mattiesko Hytönen (1997)
 Soneranputsausjenkka (1999)
 Umtsi-um (2002)
 Annelin silmin / Stressmann (2003)
 Aulis Gerlander / Haluan Aidoliksi (2004)
 Yllytyshullu / Matti on numero yksi (2004)
 Enkeleitä toisillemme – Äiti (promo, 2008)
 Katsastusinssi Nauraa (2011)
 Loirinuotiolla (2016)

Bibliography

See also
List of best-selling music artists in Finland

References

External links 
 Official website 
 
 

1964 births
2020 deaths
People from Kemi
20th-century Finnish male actors
Finnish male musicians
Finnish impressionists (entertainers)
Finnish male comedians
21st-century Finnish male actors
Finnish male film actors
Finnish male television actors
Deaths from cancer in Finland
Deaths from esophageal cancer